Means of Identification is an album by trumpeter Valery Ponomarev which was recorded in 1985 and released on the Reservoir label in 1987.

Reception 

In his review on AllMusic, Scott Yanow states "The Reservoir label debuted with this excellent effort from trumpeter Valery Ponomarev, who was making his first recording as a leader. Five years earlier he had ended a nearly four-year stay with Art Blakey's Jazz Messengers, and although he never seems to receive the fame he deserved, Ponomarev since then has been one of the top Clifford Brown-inspired hard bop trumpeters around ... the music should please hard bop collectors".

Track listing 
All compositions by Valery Ponomarev except where noted.
 "Dialogue" – 5:56
 "Means of Identification" – 4:52
 "Mirage" – 3:56
 "I Remember Clifford" (Benny Golson) – 7:41
 "Fifteenth Round" – 4:56
 "Envoy" – 5:46
 "Take Care" – 6:31
 "Take Care" [alternate take] – 6:15 Additional track on CD reissue
 "Russian Christmas Song" (Traditional) – 4:16 Additional track on CD reissue

Personnel 
Valery Ponomarev – trumpet
Ralph Moore – tenor saxophone
Hideki Takao – piano
Dennis Irwin – bass 
Kenny Washington – drums

References 

Valery Ponomarev albums
1987 albums
Reservoir Records albums
Albums recorded at Van Gelder Studio